The House Across the Bay is a 1940 film directed by Archie Mayo, starring George Raft and Joan Bennett, produced by Walter Wanger, written by Myles Connolly and Kathryn Scola, and released by United Artists. The supporting cast features Lloyd Nolan, Walter Pidgeon and Gladys George.

Plot
A gangster Steve Larwitt (George Raft) falls for one his singers Brenda Bartley (Joan Bennett) at his nightclub. They marry and live the high life for awhile. He gets set up and is sent to Alcatraz on charges of racketeering, for ten years. She suspects his lawyer Slant Kolma (Lloyd Nolan) having a hand in this problem. She rents an apartment across San Francisco Bay with a view of the prison. She is befriended by another woman Mary Bogale (Gladys George)whose husband is also jailed but also wants to have fun. One night they meet a man Tim Nolan (Walter Pidgeon) who becomes attracted by Brenda and starts pursuing her, much to her annoyance. He finally wins her over. However, she still loves her husband. Kolma tries to blackmail her and trap her, having sold off her jewelry for his "defense". He is jealous because he saw her at a restaurant with Tim. Brenda finally confides in Mary and tells her about her problems. She returns to singing to earn money. When she visits her husband in jail, that shyster lawyer is waiting for her. She hides the truth from Steve about the money being gone. Tim sees her singing at the nightclub and talking with customers. He continues to pursue her but although she has feelings for Tim, she wants to be faithful to her husband because she knows her love is the only thing that helps him get through his days. The treacherous lawyer is so full of jealousy, he goes to tell Steve about Brenda and Tim. Desperate, Steve escapes and looks for Brenda. He tries to kill her but Tim arrives in time with a gun and tells Steve about the lawyer setting him up and stealing their money. He escapes the nightclub and he tells Brenda to wait for him and at a street corner. He goes looking for the lawyer and finds him and kills him. Then returns to the bay waterfront, swims out and allows the prison posse trolling the water to capture him.

Cast
George Raft as Steve Larwitt
Joan Bennett as Brenda Bentley
Lloyd Nolan as Slant Kolma
Walter Pidgeon as Tim Nolan
Gladys George as Mary Bogel
Peggy Shannon as Alice
June Knight as Bebe
Max Wagner as Jim 
Joe Sawyer as Charley 
Cy Kendall as Crawley 
Joseph Crehan as Federal Man
Edward Fielding as Judge 
James Craig as Brenda's Friend (uncredited)
James Farley as Prison Guard (uncredited)

Production
The film was based on an original story by Myles Connolly. In 1939 it was reported Warner Bros were considering buying it as a vehicle for James Cagney and Marlene Dietrich. They could not come to an agreement and Walter Wanger bought the rights. Wanger made the film as part of what was meant to be a slate of six films for United Artists. Filming was pushed back so Wanger could make Foreign Correspondent.

George Raft was loaned by Warner Bros, dropping out of It All Came True, in which he was replaced by Humphrey Bogart. Walter Pidgeon was borrowed from MGM. Director Archie Mayo was borrowed from Sam Goldwyn. Bennett was under contract to Wanger.

Filming started 16 October 1939.

Some scenes of Pidgeon and Bennett in an airplane were filmed by Alfred Hitchcock as a favor to Wanger, for whom Hitchcock had directed Foreign Correspondent the same year.

Bennett and Wanger married after filming completed.

Reception

Box office
The film recorded a loss of $101,334. It caused tension between Raft and Warner Bros, to whom he was under long-term contract, because in this United Artists film, Raft played a gangster who loses in the end – the sort of role he had refused to play for Warner Bros.

Critical
The New York Times called it a "somewhat less than fascinating tale of one of the more glamorous Rock-widows of Alcatraz"  which was "old hat and scarcely worth its maker's bother—or yours." The Los Angeles Times thought it was "curiously (and unnecessarily) complicated."

References

External links
 

The House Across the Bay at Allmovie
The House Across the Bay at BFI

1940 films
American crime drama films
1940 crime drama films
Films directed by Archie Mayo
Films produced by Walter Wanger
American black-and-white films
Films with screenplays by Kathryn Scola
Films scored by Werner Janssen
1940s English-language films
1940s American films